Roelof Houwink (1897–1988) was a Dutch polymer scientist, educated at the University of Delft. He worked at Phillips since 1925. From 1939 to 1956 he was director-general of the TNOs Rubberinstituut in Delft.

The Mark-Houwink equation is named after him together with Herman F. Mark.

Publications 
Elasticity, Plasticity and Structure of Matter, 1937, Cambridge University Press, London

References 

Polymer scientists and engineers
20th-century Dutch chemists
Delft University of Technology alumni
1897 births
1988 deaths